Asian University (Asian U), formerly the Asian University of Science and Technology, was founded in 1993, initially with the academic co-operation of Imperial College London. It was an international university using English as the language of instruction for all programs. Asian University was on the eastern seaboard, a 30 km drive from the seaside resort of Pattaya and two hours from Bangkok. In 2017, the university council submitted the request to cease its operation through Office of the Higher Education Commission, Ministry of Education due to financial reasons. Its degree accreditations remain valid and were ratified by Office of the Civil Service Commission (OCSC) and Office of the Higher Education Commission (OHEC). 

The permission to cease its operation was granted by H.E.Teerakiat Jaroensettasin, the minister of education at a time and university was officially closed in August 2017.

History 
The privately owned university was founded when Lord Oxburgh, then rector of Imperial College London, signed the memorandum of understanding (MOU) in Bangkok to provide support for Asian University. Sir Edward Parkes, KBE, one of the UK's foremost academics, played an important role as chairman of the academic advisory board as Asian University took on its final form. The founding chairman was H.E. Anand Panyarachun, Hon. KBE and a former prime minister. The school first opened its doors to students in 1998 and closed in August 2017 due to financial reasons.

Academic programmes 
The undergraduate programme for August 2015 was as follows:

 Bachelor of Arts in English for Business Communication

 Bachelor of Arts in Digital Content (B.A., Digital Content). This programme had three concentration areas:
Digital communication
Digital content and animation
Digital content, game designBachelor of Business Administration in Business Services (B.B.A., Business Services). Its five concentration areas: 
Culinary arts and restaurant management
Finance
Hospitality and hotel management
International business
Marketing

 Bachelor of Science in Technology and Engineering Management (B.Sc., Technology and Engineering Management).''' Four concentration areas:
Facilities management
Project management
Technology management
Telecommunications and network management

In addition to the undergraduate programs, the university offered English training for Thai school teachers using the Common European Framework of Reference for Languages (CEFR).

References

See also
 List of universities in Thailand
 List of colleges and universities

Private universities and colleges in Thailand
Chonburi province
Educational institutions established in 1993
Educational institutions disestablished in 2017
1993 establishments in Thailand
2017 disestablishments in Thailand